The 1942–43 Southern Football League was the third edition of the regional war-time football league tournament.

Table

Results

References

Sources
Scottish Football History – Southern Football league

season
1
Scot